Munna Michael is a 2017 Indian Hindi-language action drama film directed by Sabbir Khan and produced by Viki Rajani and Eros International. The film features Tiger Shroff in a lead role alongside Nawazuddin Siddiqui and Niddhi Agerwal, The film was released on 21 July 2017.

It marks the third collaboration between Shroff and director Sabbir Khan after Heropanti and Baaghi. The film received mixed to negative reviews from critics.

Plot 

Manasva "Michael" Roy is a dancer inspired by Michael Jackson. One day Michael is fired from his job and disappointedly leaves the studio. On his way home, he finds a newborn baby crying on the roadside. Michael adopts the child and names him Manav "Munna" Roy. Munna, just like Michael, grows up to be an extraordinary dancer and a diehard fan of Michael Jackson. Michael doesn't want Munna to become a dancer and instead insists him to find a proper job. Munna instead visits dance clubs with his friends and challenges their dancers, thereby earning money in the process. Michael falls ill and is admitted to a hospital. When Munna goes to see him, he once again asks him to drop his idea of dancing. Meanwhile, the dance clubs in Mumbai have blacklisted Munna and his friends, so Munna decides to try his luck in Delhi.

At a club in Delhi, Munna clashes with a guy called Balli  and beats his mates. Balli is the brother of Mahender Fauji, a gangster. When Mahender learns about his brother's fight, he asks a police inspector to get him Munna. Mahender watches CCTV footage of Munna dancing in the waiting room, just before the fight with Balli begins. Mahender is impressed with Munna's dancing skills and asks Munna to teach him how to dance. During the dance sessions, Munna and Mahender become close friends. One day, some gangsters attack Mahender and Munna saves his life. After that Mahender brings Munna to Delhi and declares him to be like his brother. Mahender tells Munna that he wants to become a good dancer, because the girl he loves, Deepika "Dolly" Sharma is a dancer in a club. Munna advises Mahender to give Dolly a gift.

Mahender, instead of personally offering the gift, asks Munna to hand it to Dolly. Munna gives Dolly the gift and lies to her that he is a courier boy. Dolly and Munna become good friends after they meet each other a few more times. During their meetings, Dolly tells Munna that it is her dream to become a renowned dancer and that she would like to win the Dancing Star contest, to be held soon in Mumbai. Munna gives Dolly an appointment letter for the lead dancer role at the Blue Star Hotel in Meerut, which is owned by Mahender. Dolly accepts the offer. Mahender meets Dolly and ask her to be friends and gives her a car and a flat. When Dolly enters the flat, she finds Balli hiding in there, who tells her that Mahender would keep her as a sex slave and nothing else. Hearing this, Dolly runs away from the house. When Mahender learns of the incident, he attempts to kill Balli. Munna and Mahender's other friend step in and stop Mahender from killing Balli in his rage. During this incident Munna discovers that Mahender is married and that he was married against his will. After losing Dolly, Mahender becomes depressed and Munna promises Mahender that he will get Dolly back.

Munna returns to Mumbai and coincidentally finds Dolly who is there to participate in Dancing Star, the contest she had mentioned to Munna earlier. Dolly tells Munna that she wants to win the show so that she will be able to face her father, as she ran away from home to pursue her dancing career. Munna changes his mind to take Dolly back to Mahender and decides to help her in winning the show. Munna asks his friends to help Dolly by becoming part of his dance group. Munna had previously told Dolly that he cannot dance. One day, Dolly finds Munna dancing and training her dance group and finds that Munna had been lying to her.

Munna tells Dolly the truth. Dolly asks Munna to be her partner at the dance competition. Meanwhile, Mahender comes to Mumbai in search of Dolly, acknowledges Munna's betrayal, and brings Michael to Delhi, giving Munna 24 hours to bring Dolly to him or otherwise his father would be killed. Dolly and Munna go to Delhi and Dolly tells Mahender that she loves Munna and leaves his house. Munna, Michael and Dolly leave for Mumbai. Balli finds them and tries to beat them up, but instead, Munna beats Balli and his goons. During the fight Balli shoots Munna in the leg. Munna still goes onstage and performs with Dolly, and they win. Mahender, later, accepts Munna and Dolly's love and they remain friends.

Cast
Tiger Shroff as Manav Roy aka Munna Michael
 Nawazuddin Siddiqui as Mahender Fauji
 Nidhhi Agerwal as Deepika "Dolly" Sharma
 Siddharth Nigam as Teen Manav Roy "Munna" in "Feel The Rhythm Tonight, Baby”
 Ronit Roy as Manasva "Michael" Roy, Munna's father and caretaker
 Pankaj Tripathi as Balli
 Sudesh Lehri as Inspector Shinde
 Samir Kochhar as Ramesh
 Gulzar Dastur as Billo Aunty
 Farah Khan as Judge of Dancing Star (cameo appearance)
 Shaan as Judge of Dancing Star (cameo appearance)
 Chitrangada Singh as Judge of Dancing Star (cameo appearance)
 Pallavi Kulkarni (cameo appearance)

Soundtrack

The music for the film was composed by Meet Bros, Tanishk Bagchi, Pranaay Rijia, Vishal Mishra, Javed-Mohsin, Gourov-Roshin and Vayu, while the background score was composed by Sandeep Shirodkar. The lyrics were written by Kumaar, Danish Sabri,  Pranaay, Tanishk-Vayu and Sabbir Khan. The album was released on 21 June 2017 by Eros Music on World Music Day and includes 10 songs.

Release 

The film was released on 21 July 2017 worldwide. The film received a U/A certificate from CBFC India, which asked the makers of the film to mute the sound of smashing bones during fight sequences and Hindi expletives. The film released on 3400 screens on the first day, 3000 in India and 400 overseas.

Critical reception 

The film received mixed to negative reviews from the critics. Meena Lyer of The Times of India rated the film 2.5/5 calling its story, usual and predictable, saying, "You can almost record screen proceedings with your stopwatch because after every 15 minutes, there is a—song, fight, song, fight and some more blah." Rohit Vats of Hindustan Times rated it 1.5/5 saying, "Now it's finally a film where everybody would look disinterested and jump at a chance to break into the song. Shalini Langer of The Indian Express gave the film just half a star out of five saying, "Tiger Shroff as Munna Michael dance, Munna fights, Munna dance and fight together, this is what he is doing in the film. Subhani Singh of India Today rated the film 1.5/5, saying, "The film's script has emerged from a basic one-liner: Tiger idolises Michael Jackson so let's give him every opportunity to dance like him." Udita Jhunjhunwala of Firstpost gave the film 2/5, saying,  Put in enough of these two elements (Dancing and action) and who cares about logic, story, acting or originality. Saibal Chaterjee of NDTV rated the film 1.5/5 and said, "As is obvious, Tiger Shroff's film has nothing original or novel on offer." Kriti Tulsiani of News18 rated it 1/5 saying, "Munna Michael feels like an over-stretched version of an 80s film that rides high only on dance moves and action sequences." Kennith Rosario of The Hindu said, "A clichéd endorsement for Tiger Shroff’s abs, fighting and dancing skills." The film was rated 1.5/5 at Rediff.com and was called "A wasted opportunity at best". Zee News criticized the film by stating, "This film starts off with a promise and holds your interest till the interval. After that the narrative turns into a cliched Bollywood masala film that fails to impress." Priyadarshini Patwa of MensXP.com gave the film 1.5/5 and said, "When Tiger Shroff is in a film, the directors forget the basics of filmmaking i.e. the script. Instead of working on the crux of the story, the directors decided to make a full-length feature film with lots of dance sequences and unreasonable fight scenes as the prime focus. And of course, one line of dialogue that Tiger uses throughout the film."<ref name="M1">{{cite news|url=http://www.mensxp.com/entertainment/movie-reviews/38332-munna-michael-review-tiger-shrof-rsquo-s-dancing-is-spot-on-but-nawazuddin-siddiqui-is-the-film-s-saving-grace.html|title='Munna Michael Review: Tiger Shrofs Dancing Is Spot On But Nawazuddin Siddiqui Is The Film's Saving Grace|work=MensXP.com|author=Priyadarshini Patwa|date=22 July 2017|access-date=22 July 2017}}</ref> Mohar Basu of Mid-Day gave the film 2/5 saying, "There should be a genre of films called fan-pleasers, if there isn't one already. Munna Michael is precisely that by design – a dance-actioner that must keep its focus firmly on showcasing the dancing prowess of its leading man, Tiger Shroff." Bollywood Hungama gave the film 2.5/5 and said, "The writing of the film is a major letdown. It seems that the scriptwriter (Vimmi Datta) didn’t have much to offer after a point and took the predictable, clichéd route." Anupama Chopra of the Film Companion gave the film 1.5/5 and said it was "the stuff of pure comedy." Davesh Sharma of Filmfare gave the film 2.5/5 and said, "What this movie lacks is self-belief and great music. If the whole point of the film was to make it a tribute to Michael Jackson then MJ’s original tunes should have been used."
 Writing for Reuters, Shilpa Jamkhandikar said, "The story is straightforward and merely a device for Shroff to display his washboard abs and ample dancing skills." However, Rajat Srivastav from Bharatmovies.com classifies it in the Masala category and termed it as a ticket-worth entertainer, giving it 3.5 stars.

 Box office 
 Domestic 
The film saw 15–20% occupancy on the first day and collected  (net) from 3000 screens. It grossed  total Worldwide on first day. Munna Michael'' became the 10th highest opening day grosser Bollywood film of 2017. On the second day the film collected . Its two-day net collection rose to 12.97 crores and gross figures to 17.78 crores. On the first Sunday, the film collected 8.32 crores, raising its first weekend domestic collection to a total of 21.67 crores, becoming 10th highest domestic first weekend grossing Bollywood film of 2017. The film grossed 34.61 crores in  India in 4 days.

Overseas 
On the first day in the overseas market, the film collected  from 24 screens in Australia,  from 7 screens in New Zealand,  from 50 screens in the UK,  from 58 screens in the United States,  from 13 screens in Canada. With that the film collected  from 196 screens in its first weekend overseas. The film earned 13.5 crores overseas.

Accolades

See also
ABCD (franchise)

References

External links 

 
 

2010s Hindi-language films
Cultural depictions of Michael Jackson
Indian dance films
Indian action drama films
2017 action drama films
2010s dance films
Films shot in Jordan
Films directed by Sabbir Khan